Linebaugh is a surname, an Americanized spelling of the German surname Leinbach. Notable people with the surname include:
Donald W. Linebaugh, American archaeologist
John Linebaugh, American gunsmith
Peter Linebaugh, American historian

References